is a Japanese voice actor specializing in the voicing of characters from eroge (adult video games). He was a member of AG Promotion.

Filmography

Video games
 EVE burst error (1995) – Susumu Nikaido
 One: Kagayaku Kisetsu e (1998) – Mamoru Sumii
 Meguri, Hitohira (2003) – Toshinobu Okina
 Clover Heart's (2003) – Roberto Ichimonji
 Angel Type (2005) – Akira Shidara
 Harukoi Otome (2006) – Tasuku Oikawa
 Konna Ko ga itara Boku wa mou (2006) – Susumu

References

External links 
 

Japanese male voice actors
Living people
Place of birth missing (living people)
Year of birth missing (living people)